Acanthophora is also a synonym for Aralia. For the section of Solanum, see Solanum sect. Acanthophora.Acanthophora is a genus of marine red algae in the family Rhodomelaceae.There are 26 species (and infraspecific) names in the AlgaeBase database at present, of which 7 have been flagged as currently accepted taxonomically.

 Species 
Species in the genus Acanthophora include:
 Acanthophora dendroides Acanthophora spicifera Acanthophora aokii Acanthophora muscoides Acanthophora nayadiformis Acanthophora pacifica Acanthophora ramulosa''

References
World Register of Marine Species 
AlgaeBase

Rhodomelaceae
Red algae genera